Peripentadenia is a genus of two species of large trees from the family Elaeocarpaceae endemic to the rainforests of northeastern Queensland, Australia. Sometimes they have the common name quandong.

Botanists have formally described two species, both endemic to restricted areas of the Wet Tropics rainforests of northeastern Queensland.

Both species have official recognition of at risk of extinction in the wild.

Species
 Peripentadenia mearsii  Buff or Grey Quandong – endemic to a restricted area of the Wet Tropics rainforests
Synonym and base name: Actephila mearsii 
Queensland government official "near threatened" species conservation status.
 Peripentadenia phelpsii  – endemic to a very restricted part of the rainforests of the Mossman area of the Wet Tropics
Queensland government official "vulnerable" species conservation status.

References

Cited works
 

Elaeocarpaceae
Elaeocarpaceae genera
Flora of Queensland